Ohiyesa "Pow Wow" Smith is a fictional Western hero published by DC Comics. Created by writer Don Cameron and penciler Carmine Infantino, he is a Sioux who is the sheriff of the small Western town of Elkhorn, where he is known as a master detective. He prefers to be addressed by his proper name, Ohiyesa, but people called him "Pow Wow" so stubbornly that he eventually gives up and accepts the nickname among them.

Originally, the Pow Wow Smith character was located in the modern West. Later stories were set in the 19th century. It was eventually retconned that the Old West character was the ancestor of the modern-day character. Since then, Smith has remained a generation legacy, and a historical figure in the DC Universe, meeting other heroes in their occasional time travel stories.

Publication history
Smith first appeared in Detective Comics #151, the only Western feature in the book. After four years as a regular feature in Detective Comics, his strip became the lead feature of Western Comics, which ran until 1961. Much of the art during the Detective period was by Leonard Starr, and when Smith found a home in Western Comics, his original illustrator Infantino returned. Stories were by France Herron and later Gardner Fox.

Smith also starred in the premiere issue of All-Star Western's second volume.

Fictional character biography
Ohiyesa left his native Red Deer Valley to learn more about the white man's world. His tracking and expert gun skills won him employment as a deputy sheriff, and eventually the job of sheriff of Elkhorn. Ohiyesa's deputy is Hank Brown. Once sheriff, Pow Wow spends most of his time in Elkhorn, only rarely returning to Red Deer Valley.

For most of his adventures, Pow Wow's girlfriend (and later fiancée) is the Native American maiden Fleetfoot, daughter of Chief Thundercloud. Fleetfloot aids Pow Wow in a number of adventures.

U.S. Marshal Pow Wow Smith 
U.S. Marshal Ohiyesa Smith, a present-day descendant of the original Pow Wow Smith, appears in Robin (vol. 2) Annual #6, a Western pastiche that also featured a modern-day version of Nighthawk. This Ohiyesa attended college in the East, then returned to Red Deer Valley, seeking to modernize his tribe. As a U.S. Marshall, he too takes the name Pow Wow Smith, but continues to live in Red Deer Valley. The modern-day Pow Wow Smith works with Robin and other heroes to take down the modern-day Trigger Twins, who unlike their 19th-century antecedents are homicidal criminals. Much of the adventure takes place in a tourist-spot recreation of an Old West town, which is located near Gotham City.

In other media
Ohiyesa Smith appears in the Justice League Unlimited episode "The Once and Future Thing Part One: Weird Western Tales", voiced by Jonathan Joss. This version was a sheriff of Elkhorn in the 1880s and dislikes being called "Pow Wow". After being run out of town by Tobias Manning via Chronos's future technology, Smith joins forces with Bat Lash, El Diablo, Jonah Hex, and a time-traveling Green Lantern, Wonder Woman and Batman to defeat Manning.

References

External links
Don Markstein's Toonopedia: Pow-Wow Smith
DCU Guide: Pow-Wow Smith I 
DCU Guide: Pow-Wow Smith II 
DCU Guide: Pow-Wow Smith III

Characters created by Carmine Infantino
Comics characters introduced in 1949
DC Comics Western (genre) characters
DC Comics male characters
Fictional Sioux people
Fictional characters from Oklahoma
Fictional American police detectives
Golden Age adventure heroes
Western (genre) gunfighters
Western (genre) peace officers